No Shame is the fourth album and major label debut by Hawaiian band Pepper. Released on October 3, 2006 through Atlantic Records, it features production from Producer and Songwriter Zach Barnhorst,  Nick Hexum of 311, Tony Kanal of No Doubt, and Sublime producer Paul Leary.

They recorded a video for the first single, "No Control".

The album was re-released in Japan on July 9, 2008 on Powerslave Records, and includes two bonus tracks and a DVD featuring music videos for "No Control" and "Your Face."

Track listing 
 Bring Me Along - 3:32
 Rent - 3:38
 No Control - 3:12
 Green Hell - 3:30
 Lost in America - 2:02
 UFA Point (Skit) - 1:25
 Your Face - 3:22
 Nice Time - 2:50
 Crazy Love - 2:56
 Like Your Style - 3:43
 Point and Shoot - 4:10
 Old Time Problem - 3:36
 Beers (Skit) - 0:33
 Outta My Face - 2:28
 Wanted - 3:14
 Good Enough - 2:17
 Zicky's Song - 3:45
 Intro (Skit) - 1:14

2008 Japanese Re-Release

CD 
 Bring Me Along - 3:32
 Rent - 3:38
 No Control - 3:12
 Green Hell - 3:30
 Lost in America - 2:02
 UFA Point (Skit) - 1:25
 Your Face - 3:22
 Nice Time - 2:50
 Crazy Love - 2:56
 Like Your Style - 3:43
 Point and Shoot - 4:10
 Old Time Problem - 3:36
 Beers (Skit) - 0:33
 Outta My Face - 2:28
 Wanted - 3:14
 Good Enough - 2:17
 Zicky's Song - 3:45
 Intro (Skit) - 1:14
 Ordinary Day

DVD 
 No Control
 Your Face

Personnel 

 Bret Bollinger - Bass, Vocals, Group Member
 Kaleo Wassman - Guitar, Vocals, Group Member
 Yesod Williams - Percussion, Drums, Group Member
 Zach Barnhorst - Song Writer, Producer

Charts 
Album - Billboard (North America)

References 

2006 albums
Pepper (band) albums
Albums produced by Paul Leary